Daisy is an unincorporated community in northwestern Cape Girardeau County, Missouri, United States. It is located sixteen miles northwest of Cape Girardeau and is part of the Cape Girardeau–Jackson, MO-IL Metropolitan Statistical Area.

A post office called Daisy has been in operation since 1887. The community has the name of a pioneer citizen's wife.

References 

Unincorporated communities in Cape Girardeau County, Missouri
Cape Girardeau–Jackson metropolitan area
Unincorporated communities in Missouri